Seomun Market is the largest traditional street market in Daegu, South Korea, containing more than 4,000 shops. Seomun Market is particularly known as a source for textiles and sewing services, a key ingredient of Daegu's fashion industry.

The name "Seomun" means "west gate," and refers to the location of the market just outside the old west gate of Daegu Castle, which was demolished in 1907. It is also one of the country's oldest markets, dating to a 5-day market held in the area in the late Joseon Dynasty. In the final years of Joseon, Seomun market was one of the country's three largest markets. The market was constituted in its present form in 1920.

Although portions of the market are in the open air or small buildings, most of the shops are in large buildings holding hundreds or thousands of individual shops. The largest of these buildings was Building 2, which was destroyed by fire in late December 2005. Plans for the reconstruction of Building 2, which held the majority of the market's fabric shops, are still being made. There are four other building complexes, and two other large shopping areas. Side streets in the market area also feature a large number of indoor and outdoor food stalls with fish and traditional dishes.

The market can be reached both by Cheongnaeondeok Station on Daegu Metro Line 2 and Seomun Market Station on Daegu Metro Line 3.

On November 30, 2016, a massive fire destroyed all the stores in the market.

See also
List of markets in South Korea
List of South Korean tourist attractions
Economy of South Korea

References

External links

Seomun Sijang Information Center 

Jung District, Daegu
Retail markets in Daegu